Baba ghanoush, also spelled baba ganoush or baba ghanouj, is a Levantine appetizer consisting of finely chopped roasted eggplant, olive oil,  lemon juice, various seasonings, and tahini. The eggplant is traditionally baked or broiled over an open flame before peeling, so that the pulp is soft and has a smoky taste. It is a typical meze ('starter') of the regional cuisine, often served as a side to a main meal and as a dip for pita bread.

A very similar dish is mutabbal ( lit. 'spiced'). Mutabbal is sometimes said to be a spicier version of baba ghanoush. Mutabbal consists of mashed roasted eggplants, tahini, salt, garlic, lemon and often yogurt.

Etymology 
The bābā is an Arabic word that means 'father' and is also a term of endearment, while ġannūj could be a personal name. The word combination is also interpreted as "father of coquetry" or "indulged/pampered/flirtatious daddy" or "spoiled old daddy". It is not certain whether the word bābā refers to the eggplant, or to an actual person indulged by the dish.

Varieties
Eastern Arabian cuisine versions of the dish vary slightly from those of the Levant by spicing it with coriander and cumin; those versions might be minimally spiced and topped with thinly chopped parsley or coriander leaves.

In Turkey, the dish is known as babaganuş or abugannuş. While the ingredients vary from region to region, the essentials (eggplants, tahini, garlic, lemon) are generally the same.

In Armenia, the dish is known as mutabal. The essential ingredients in Armenian mutabal are eggplant, tahini, garlic, lemon, and onion; and most Armenians also add cumin.

In Syria, the dish is often mixed with sheep cheese, which turns it into a creamier dish.

Food writer and historian Gil Marks writes in his book that: "Israelis learned to make baba ghanouj from the Arabs". An Israeli variant, salat ḥatzilim, is made with fried or grilled eggplants mixed with mayonnaise, salt, lemon and chopped fried onions. It is usually topped with olive oil when served.

See also
 List of Middle Eastern dishes
 Eggplant salads and appetizers, an overview of similar dishes prepared around the world
 List of dips
 List of eggplant dishes
 List of hors d'oeuvre
 List of Arab salads

References

Bibliography

Appetizers
Arab cuisine
Assyrian cuisine
Dips (food)
Eggplant dishes
Egyptian cuisine
Iraqi cuisine
Israeli cuisine
Jordanian cuisine
Lebanese cuisine
Levantine cuisine
Middle Eastern cuisine
Palestinian cuisine
Qatari cuisine
Syrian cuisine
Vegan cuisine
Vegetable dishes